is a manga written and illustrated by Kei Sanbe. It was serialized in Square Enix bi-monthly seinen magazine Young Gangan from December 2007 to July 2009. It is set on a nearly deserted island in Japan where six orphaned or abandoned schoolchildren live alone with their four adult teachers in the decrepit ruin of an old school.

Summary
The Manga's main plotline is about the two siblings and main characters, Kokoro and Yume, who are sent to a remote island after their parents abandon them. There, they begin to attend school where they meet four adult teachers and four orphaned or abandoned children who are the only other inhabitants of the island, along with the owner of the island. The primary buildup of the storyline develops after the main characters start hearing rumors and discover a secret room. The kids begin to suspect the adults are trying to hide something from them. They put their lives on the line in an attempt to discover what it is as the story unfolds.

Characters

Kokoro is a 10-year-old boy who was abandoned by his parents. His parents have entrusted his younger sister Yume to his care. Along with the other children, he tries to find out the secrets of the island.

Kokoro's 5-year-old sister. She is blind and depends on her brother most of the time. As a result of being blind, Yume has a keenly developed sense of hearing, hinted at when she hears the voice of an unseen girl that the other kids can't hear. She is also talented and intelligent, having the ability to identify people through their footsteps. A character with the same name, apparent blindness, and even an older brother who seemingly resembles Kokoro appears in another of Sanbe's series, Cradle of Monsters; this character may be in fact the same Yume.

Shuichiro, known as "Shu" for short, is a 10-year-old boy with an IQ of 150. He was raised by a single mother, an insurance saleswoman who was driven into neurotic behavior from poverty and tried to commit a double suicide with Shuichiro by driving a car off a cliff. Shuichiro, having survived, came to see adults as enemies as a result. With his high intelligence and knowledge of his mother's past career, he is mature and hypothesized that the teachers are killing students for insurance money. He became the leader of the students when Rikiya was injured and removed from school, and under the belief that Rikiya was murdered, decided to lead the remaining students to escape.

Hatsune is an 11-year-old girl. She is mute due to her gambling addict parents beating her for singing after an anime song, and did not dare to speak again ever since; her parents eventually abandon her to escape their debtors. She loves music, and plays a recorder despite not speaking any further. She also became frightened and traumatized of Kuwadate when he nearly raped her. She regained her ability to speak after meeting Kokoro, warning him about Kuwadate attacking him.

Futoshi is a 10-year-old boy with a heavy eating disorder. Ever since his parents died, he lived with his grandmother, and he keeps eating as a way to escape reality, thus leading him to be obese. Futoshi's obsession with food led him to cry out when it is taken away from him, but he overcame his disorder partially when the headmaster was closing in on him and Yume; he chose to save Yume over the food in his backpack.

Referred as the "King of Brats", he was somewhat the leader of the students on the island. He started to tell lies after his parents were sentenced to prison, but is a loyal friend. He wanted a supposedly existing gold mine found on the island to survive in the outer world once they escape from the island, but he was injured from a fall due to a slip from climbing. The others misinterpreted that the teachers murdered him for defying them until he later showed up with Hisanobu, discharged from the hospital.

Hisanobu, "Nobu" for short, is Rikiya's right-hand man, and is considered to be an expert at hide-and-seek. He suffered stress-induced illness, and was vomiting blood into a drawer to keep people from finding out. He also kept a pocket knife to defend himself from teachers. Sometime before the Suzuhara siblings' arrival, Kuwadate saw him vomiting blood in the bathroom, and took him to the hospital. Futoshi misinterpreted the scene as Kuwadate killing Nobu for trying to find out evidence about the school's darker activities, until he later showed up with Rikiya, discharged from the hospital.

Yukino is the newest teacher on Hōzuki Island school, being in charge of health and physical education. She is a 2-dan in kendo. She was neglected by her parents, and due to her friend Mai being incarcerated for child abuse, Yukino herself decided to become a teacher to understand the relationship between children and adults. She wants to help the students in any way, but they were distrusting of her along with the other adults. She shows her true allegiance when she saved Kokoro from Kuwadate. After the island school was shut down, she became a teacher in Okinawa, still keeping in touch with Kokoro.

Kuwadate is one of the four teachers on the island, and the main antagonist. He is perverted and cruel, trying to molest and rape Yukino and Hatsune, as well as threatening to murder any of the students under the pretense of "accident". He also killed Usui for interfering with his advances on Yukino, and with all his crimes added up, he was ultimately sentenced to 13 years in prison.

Usui is a large man, a teacher on the island, and a friend of Yukino. He warned Kuwadate to stop harassing Yukino, which led the former to kill him to prevent any further interferences. While Shuichiro loosened a ladder's bottom step so Usui would suffer a broken leg, Kuwadate flipped the ladder, so Usui suffered a higher fall, breaking his neck.

Toyoda is the elderly headmaster of the school. He loved the school and wanted to educate the children to be prepared to leave for the outside world. However, due to a misunderstanding, it would appear that he was inciting the murder of children to gain insurance to keep the school running when money was running low. He was killed when a dog knocked him into a water container in the coal mine, causing him to hit his skull and drown in it.

The ghost of a girl, who was a former student of the school, appeared in front of the students from time to time, giving them various pointers when they were in danger. She died of what the headmaster treated as "accident", but before her death, she requested that her insurance would be used to keep the school running. Shuichiro came to believe that she was no more than an illusion caused by their own instincts, but Hatsune saw her one last time seven years after the tragedy was over.

Manga
The series is written and illustrated by Kei Sanbe and serialized in Square Enix bi-monthly seinen magazine Young Gangan from December 21, 2007 to July 3, 2009, totalizing 27 chapters. The chapters were collected into four tankōbon, the first one released on May 22, 2008, and the fourth on September 25, 2009.

Outside Japan this series has been licensed by Ki-Oon in France.

Reception
Animeland reviewed the first volume of the French edition as a well-made thriller, praising the mise-en-scène and the ambiance; the use of the children's points of view was viewed positively but the character of Kuwadate was described as disgusting.

References

2007 manga
Gangan Comics manga
Kei Sanbe
Seinen manga